Ramis (BE) Bahshaliyev. 
Bahshaliyev is a 9-time World Powerlifting Champion (Amateur Athletic Union (AAU)) and operates out of the British Columbian city of Port Moody. He was born in 1971 in the town of Iolotan, at the time in the former-USSR and now the capital of Ýolöten District in the Mary Province of Turkmenistan. Between 1989 and 2004, Bahshaliyev represented Turkmen SSR (USSR) and Turkmenistan in powerlifting and bodybuilding competitions, with the title of the nation being represented changing in 2001, following the dissolution of the USSR.

Bahshaliyev is currently listed as the British Columbian contact for the AAU Powerlifting division.

External links
http://image.aausports.org/sports/powerlifting/results/2008/07WorldatDWWS-male.pdf
http://image.aausports.org/sports/powerlifting/results/2006/laughlin_results.pdf
http://image.aausports.org/sports/powerlifting/results/2003/worlds_2003.pdf
http://image.aausports.org/sports/powerlifting/results/2002/02_dec_nev.pdf
http://image.aausports.org/sports/powerlifting/results/2001/worldbench.htm
http://en.allpowerlifting.com/lifters/TKM/Bakhshaliev-Ramis-1149/
https://web.archive.org/web/20110508001808/http://www.powerlifting-ipf.com/fileadmin/data/results/worlds/bench98results.htm
https://web.archive.org/web/20110927085316/http://www.powerlifting-ipf.com/fileadmin/data/results/worlds/men99results.htm
http://2001-2009.state.gov/documents/organization/6059.pdf

Sources
https://web.archive.org/web/20111204000040/http://www.powerlifting.jp/ASIA/
http://bcpowerlifting.ca

References

1971 births
Living people
Canadian people of Russian descent
Canadian male weightlifters